The splenius capitis is a broad, straplike muscle in the back of the neck. It pulls on the base of the skull from the vertebrae in the neck and upper thorax. It is involved in movements such as shaking the head.

Structure
It arises from the lower half of the nuchal ligament, from the spinous process of the seventh cervical vertebra, and from the spinous processes of the upper three or four thoracic vertebrae.

The fibers of the muscle are directed upward and laterally and are inserted, under cover of the sternocleidomastoideus, into the mastoid process of the temporal bone, and into the rough surface on the occipital bone just below the lateral third of the superior nuchal line. The splenius capitis is deep to sternocleidomastoideus at the mastoid process, and to the trapezius for its lower portion. It is one of the muscles that forms the floor of the posterior triangle of the neck.

The splenius capitis muscle is innervated by the posterior ramus of spinal nerves C3 and C4.

Function
The splenius capitis muscle is a prime mover for head extension. The splenius capitis can also allow lateral flexion and rotation of the cervical spine.

Additional images

See also

References

External links

  - "Superficial layer of the extrinsic muscles of the back."
  - "Intermediate layer of the extrinsic muscles of the back, deep muscles."
  - "Identification of the muscles associated with the posterolateral triangle."
 PTCentral

Muscles of the torso